Ilie Ilașcu (born 30 July 1952) is a Moldovan-born Romanian politician, especially known for being sentenced to death by the separatist Transnistrian government for alleged involvement in two murders and for actions which have been described as Moldovan state-sponsored terrorism by Transnistrian government officials.

Political activity

Born in Taxobeni, Fălești district, Ilașcu graduated from the Faculty of Economic Studies of the Agricultural Institute in Chișinău. He is married to Nina and they have two daughters, Tatiana (b. 28 February 1980) and Olga (b. 1 July 1984). Ilie Ilașcu worked as chief economist at "Dnestr" Research Institute in Tiraspol. Ilașcu became known for his opposition to Moldovan Communist Party politics regarding the Moldovan language, for openly advocating the usage of Latin script and for recognition of a Moldovan-Romanian identity, as well as for giving Moldovan the status of an official language.

His opponents nicknamed him "glavnîi extremist" (chief extremist) instead of "glavnîi economist" (chief economist). In January 1989 he was one of the founders of a Moldovan association in Tiraspol. On July 9, 1989 he was arrested for the first time, being released with excuses after few days. Also in 1989 he was dismissed from his job, but was able to regain his position after appealing to the prosecutor office. On September 5, 1989 as he spoke at a meeting in Tiraspol in favour of the language laws passed by the Moldovan parliament, he was taken away by policemen, who needed to protect him from the crowd of political opponents.

Starting with 1989, he was the president of the Tiraspol branch of the Moldovan Popular Front, which advocated the union of Moldova and Romania.

He is a leader of the Democratic Forum of Romanians in Moldova. In 2010, Ilașcu announced he will support Mihai Ghimpu and the Liberal Party.

The Ilașcu group trial
On June 2, 1992, he and three more ethnic Romanians (Andrei Ivanțoc, Alexandru Leșco and Tudor Petrov Popa) were arrested by the breakaway Transnistrian government and charged with the murder of two separatist officials.

On 9 December 1993, the Supreme Court of Transnistria found him guilty of a number of offences defined in the Criminal Code of the Moldovan Soviet Socialist Republic, including incitement to commit an offence against national security, organisation of activities with the aim of committing extremely dangerous offences against the State, murdering a representative of the State with the aim of spreading terror, premeditated murder, unlawfully requisitioning means of transport, deliberate destruction of another's property and illegal or unauthorised use of ammunition or explosives.

Ilașcu was sentenced to be shot and the other three defendants were sentenced to hard labour for terms between 12 and 15 years. They had no right of appeal.
 
During the trial, the defendants were kept in reinforced iron cages, as they were considered "extremely dangerous". This decision was contested by various international human rights organizations, which doubted the fairness of the trial and alleged that they were prosecuted only because they were members of the Tiraspol branch of the Popular Front, a Moldovan party which favours a union with Romania. For years he was kept in solitary confinement without access to family and medical assistance.

While in the Transnistrian prison, Ilașcu was elected twice to the Moldovan Parliament on the lists of the Democratic Christian Popular Front, in 1994 and 1998 election.

In October 2000, he received Romanian citizenship, after which he renounced his Moldovan citizenship. In the same year, he was elected to the Senate of Romania for the Greater Romania Party, representing Bacău County. Reelected in 2004, Ilașcu served as a member of the Senate until 2008.

Release
Ilașcu was eventually released on May 5, 2001, two years after he filed an application with the European Court of Human Rights and following a verdict of the European Court for Human Rights, where he had sued both Russia and Moldova.

The other three members of the group were released as follows:
 Andrei Ivanțoc - June 2, 2007
 Alexandru Leșco - June 2, 2004
 Tudor Petrov Popa - June 4, 2007

Russian authorities denied any involvement in the affair.

Ilașcu and Others v. Moldova and Russia
The European Court of Human Rights judged in 2004 that the authorities have infringed the human rights (as defined by the European Convention on Human Rights) of Ilie Ilașcu and the other three people arrested by the Transnistrian government. The ruling came after a legal process that began in 1999. The court ruled that the Supreme Court of the PMR was not an actual court with any jurisdiction over the detainees, and its findings that led to their conviction were not considered. Under the court's decision, Russia was to pay Ilașcu 187,000 euros. Alexandru Tănase was a lawyer for Ilașcu.

Awards
 Order of the Star of Romania, 2001
 Order of the Republic (Moldova), 2010

References

External links
US Department of State - Moldova, Country Reports on Human Rights Practices  - 2000

1952 births
Living people
People from Fălești District
Members of the Senate of Romania
European Court of Human Rights cases involving Moldova
European Court of Human Rights cases involving Russia
Popular Front of Moldova politicians
Greater Romania Party politicians
Romanian people of Moldovan descent
Transnistrian people
Romanian prisoners sentenced to death
Moldovan prisoners sentenced to death
Prisoners sentenced to death by Transnistria
Romanian people convicted of murder
Moldovan people convicted of murder
People convicted of murder by Transnistria
Moldovan MPs 1994–1998
Moldovan MPs 1998–2001
Ilașcu Group
Recipients of the Order of the Republic (Moldova)